This is the electoral history of Beto O'Rourke, who served as a member of the United States House of Representatives from Texas's 16th congressional district from 2013 to 2019. He previously served in the El Paso City Council from 2005 to 2011. O'Rourke came to national prominence during his 2018 United States Senate campaign in Texas, where he narrowly lost to incumbent Republican Ted Cruz.  He later sought the 2020 Democratic nomination for President, but ended his campaign before any votes were cast.

El Paso City Council elections

2005

2007

United States House of Representatives elections

2012

2014

2016

United States Senate election

2018

United States Presidential election

2020

In 2019, O'Rourke was a candidate for the 2020 Democratic nomination for President of the United States. He dropped out before voting began and endorsed Joe Biden several months later.

Texas gubernatorial election

2022

Results

References 

Beto O'Rourke
O'Rourke,Beto
O'Rourke, Beto